The WTVY-TV Tower is a 1,901 ft (579 m) tall structure located in Bethlehem, Florida (2035 ft / 620 m above sea level). Erected in 1978 by WTVY channel 4 (CBS) in Dothan, Alabama, it is the tallest structure and the highest point in the state of Florida. WTVY previously utilized a 1,209 ft (368.5 m) tower located 5 miles east of Dothan in the Webb community.  The old tower is still home to WTVY-FM. The new tower enables WTVY-TV to broadcast an omnidirectional signal for 80 miles which covers most of the Florida panhandle, south Alabama, and southwest Georgia. 

In 1988, WDJR-FM located their antenna at the 1,500 ft (457 m) mark but had to relocate due to weight issues caused by the transition to digital TV and an extra antenna being needed by WTVY. WDJR built a 1,000 ft (305 m) tower beside WTVY in 2006.  In 2013, WRGX, the new NBC affiliate and sister station to WTVY began broadcasting from the tower at the 1,500 ft (457 m) mark.

Towers in Florida
Radio masts and towers in the United States
Towers completed in 1978
1978 establishments in Florida
Buildings and structures in Holmes County, Florida